Panopoda repanda, the orange panopoda, is a species of moth in the family Erebidae.

The MONA or Hodges number for Panopoda repanda is 8589.

References

Further reading

 
 
 

Eulepidotinae
Articles created by Qbugbot
Moths described in 1858